Citizen Ashe is an 2021 American-British documentary film directed by Rex Miller and Sam Pollard revolving around the life and career of Arthur Ashe. Alex Gibney and John Legend were two of the executive producers.

It had its world premiere at the Telluride Film Festival on September 3, 2021. It began a limited release by Magnolia Pictures on December 3, 2021.

Synopsis
Citizen Ashe tells the story of tennis champion and civil rights activist, Arthur Ashe, as he rises to prominence after becoming the first African American to win the US Open in 1968. The assassinations of Martin Luther King Jr. and Robert F. Kennedy jumpstart Ashe's political activism and provide him with a platform for social change. Jeanne Moutoussamy-Ashe, Johnnie Ashe, Billie Jean King, John McEnroe, Donald Dell, Lenny Simpson and Harry Edwards appear in the film.

Production
In July 2021, it was announced that Miller and Pollard had directed a film revolving around the life of Ashe, with CNN Films producing and HBO Max distributing.

Release
It had its world premiere at the Telluride Film Festival on September 3, 2021. It was also screened at the Camden International Film Festival on September 19, 2021. It had a limited release on December 3, 2021, by Magnolia Pictures.

Reception

Awards

References

External links
 

2021 films
2021 documentary films
American sports documentary films
Documentary films about HIV/AIDS
CNN Films films
HBO Max films
2020s English-language films
British sports documentary films
HIV/AIDS in American films
HIV/AIDS in British films
2020s American films
2020s British films